Théodore Pellerin (born June 13, 1997) is a Canadian film and television actor from Quebec. He is most noted for his performance in the 2018 film Family First (Chien de garde), for which he won the Prix Iris for Revelation of the Year at the 20th Quebec Cinema Awards, and the Canadian Screen Award for Best Actor at the 7th Canadian Screen Awards. In 2021, he starred as Oliver Larsson in the Netflix film There's Someone Inside Your House.

He is the son of dancer and choreographer Marie Chouinard and painter Denis Pellerin.

Career

Pellerin has appeared in the films Endorphine, Boost, The Demons, It's Only the End of the World, The Beep Test, Boy Erased, Never Steady, Never Still, Isla Blanca, Genesis (Genèse), Ville Neuve, and Never Rarely Sometimes Always. Recently, he portrayed the pyramid scheme true believer Cody Bonar on the Showtime series On Becoming a God in Central Florida.

In August 2019, Pellerin was cast in the Netflix slasher film There's Someone Inside Your House. The film was released on October 6, 2021.

In 2020, he narrated a portion of the 8th Canadian Screen Awards.

Filmography

Film

Television

References

External links

Canadian male film actors
Canadian male television actors
Male actors from Quebec
French Quebecers
Living people
Best Actor Genie and Canadian Screen Award winners
1997 births
Best Supporting Actor Jutra and Iris Award winners